The Utah Kid is a 1930 American pre-Code Western film directed by Richard Thorpe and starring Rex Lease and Boris Karloff.

Cast

 Rex Lease as Cal Reynolds
 Dorothy Sebastian as Jennie Lee
 Tom Santschi as Butch
 Mary Carr as Aunt Ada
 Walter Miller as Sheriff Jim Bentley
 Lafe McKee as Parson Joe
 Boris Karloff as Henchman Baxter
 Bud Osborne as Deputy
 Chuck Baldra as Henchman (uncredited)
 Ralph Bucko as Henchman (uncredited)
 Bob Burns as Barfly (uncredited)
 Fred Burns as Rancher (uncredited)
 Bob Card as Henchman (uncredited)
 Bud McClure as  Henchman (uncredited)
 Art Mix as Deputy (uncredited)
 Jack Rockwell as Henchman (uncredited)
 Hal Taliaferro as Deputy (uncredited)
 Al Taylor as Henchman (uncredited)
 Blackie Whiteford as Henchman (uncredited)
 Jay Wilsey as Deputy (uncredited)

Plot
A reformed outlaw (Lease) marries a teacher (Sebastian) to protect her from his gang,

Production
In addition to Thorpe as director, Frank Howard Clark was the screenwriter, and Arthur Reed was the cinematographer.

See also
 Boris Karloff filmography

References

External links

Stills and reviews at dorothysebastian.com

1930 films
1930 Western (genre) films
American Western (genre) films
American black-and-white films
1930s English-language films
Films directed by Richard Thorpe
Tiffany Pictures films
1930s American films